Hyoscyamus niger, commonly known as henbane, black henbane, or stinking nightshade, is a poisonous plant in the nightshade family Solanaceae. It is native to temperate Europe and Siberia, and naturalised in Great Britain and Ireland.

Historical use
The name henbane dates at least to AD 1265. The origins of the word are unclear, but "hen" probably originally meant death rather than referring to chickens. Other etymologies of the word associate it with the Indo-European stem *bhelena whose hypothetical meaning is 'crazy plant' and with the Proto-Germanic element bil meaning ‘vision, hallucination; magical power, miraculous ability’.

Henbane was historically used in combination with other plants, such as mandrake, deadly nightshade, and datura, as an anaesthetic potion, as well as for its psychoactive properties in "magic brews".  These psychoactive properties include visual hallucinations and a sensation of flight. It was originally used in continental Europe, Asia, and the Arab world, though it did spread to England in the Middle Ages. The use of henbane by the ancient Greeks was documented by Pliny, who said it was "of the nature of wine and therefore offensive to the understanding", and by Dioscorides, who recommended it as a sedative and analgesic.

The plant, recorded as Herba Apollinaris, was used to yield oracles by the priestesses of Apollo. Recently evidence for its use in the earlier British Neolithic has been debated. John Gerard's Herball states: "The leaves, the seeds and the juice, when taken internally cause an unquiet sleep, like unto the sleep of drunkenness, which continueth long and is deadly to the patient. To wash the feet in a decoction of Henbane, as also the often smelling of the flowers causeth sleep."

The plant was also purportedly used as a fumigant for magical purposes. Albertus Magnus, in his work De Vegetalibus (1250), reported that necromancers used henbane to invoke the souls of the dead as well as demons. Henbane was already being demonized as early as the Late Middle Ages when it became inseparably associated with witchcraft and malefic practices. “The witches drank the decoction of henbane and had those dreams for which they were tortured and executed. It was also used for witches’ ointments and was used for making weather and conjuring spirits. If there were a great drought then a stalk of henbane would be dipped into a spring, then the sun-baked sand would be sprinkled with this” (Perger 1864, 181).

During a Pomeranian witchcraft trial in 1538, a suspected witch "confessed" that she had given a man henbane seeds so that he would run around "crazy" (sexually aroused). In a file from an Inquisition trial, it was noted that "a witch admits" having once strewn henbane seeds between two lovers and uttering the following formula: "Here I sow wild seed, and the devil advised that they would hate and avoid each other until these seeds had been separated" (Marzell 1922, 169).

Henbane was one of the ingredients in gruit, traditionally used in beers as a flavouring. Several cities, most notably Pilsen, were named after its German name "Bilsenkraut" in the context of its production for beer flavouring. The recipe for henbane beer includes 40 g dried chopped henbane herbage, 5 g bayberry, 23 L water, 1 L brewing malt, 900 g honey, 5 g dried yeast, and brown sugar. Henbane fell out of usage for beer when it was replaced by hops in the 11th to 16th centuries, as the Bavarian Purity Law of 1516 outlawed ingredients other than barley, hops, yeast, and water.

Henbane is sometimes identified with the "hebenon" poured into the ear of Hamlet's father, although other candidates for hebenon exist.

Theories 

Henbane seeds have been found in a Viking grave near Fyrkat, Denmark, that was first described in 1977. This and other archaeological finds show that H. niger was known to the Vikings. Analysis of the symptoms caused by intoxication of this plant suggest that it may have been used by berserkers to induce the rage state that they used in war.

Cultivation and use

Henbane originated in Eurasia, and is now globally distributed as a plant grown mainly for pharmaceutical purposes. Henbane is rare in northern Europe; its cultivation for medicinal use is spread and legal in central and eastern Europe and in India. Henbane is an endangered plant according to the World Conservation Union's Red List.

Henbane is used in traditional herbal medicine for ailments of the bones, rheumatism, toothache, asthma, cough, nervous diseases, and stomach pain. It might also be used as analgesic, sedative, and narcotic in some cultures. Adhesive bandages with henbane extract behind the ear are reported to prevent discomfort in travel-sick people. Henbane oil is used for medicinal massage.

Henbane material in most Western countries can be bought in pharmacies with a prescription only. Sales of henbane oil are not legally regulated and are allowed in shops other than pharmacies in the US.

Preparation, dosage, toxicity
Henbane leaves and herbage without roots are chopped and dried and are then used for medicinal purposes or in incense and smoking blends, in making beer and tea, and in seasoning wine. Henbane leaves are boiled in oil to derive henbane oil. Henbane seeds are an ingredient in incense blends.  In all preparations, the dosage has to be carefully estimated due to the high toxicity of henbane. For some therapeutic applications, dosages like 0.5 g and 1.5– 3 g were used. The lethal dosage is not known.

Henbane is toxic to cattle, wild animals, fish, and birds. Not all animals are susceptible; for example, the larvae of some Lepidoptera species, including cabbage moths, eat henbane. Pigs are immune to henbane toxicity and are reported to enjoy the effects of the plant.

Psychoactive material 

Hyoscyamine, scopolamine, and other tropane alkaloids have been found in the foliage and seeds of the plant. The standard alkaloid content has been reported to be 0.03% to 0.28%.

Its psychoactive and pharmacological effects are a result of these alkaloids exerting an anticholinergic mechanism of action which blocks the function of acetylcholine in the brain and antagonizes the muscarinic receptors. This results in an altered state of consciousness, hallucinogenic experiences, and typically, delirium. This mechanism of action is not only linked to dangerous effects and accidents, but dementia as well. Since toxicity/lethality is such a major concern with plants like henbane; many traditional preparations of henbane or other similar scopolamine-containing plants were designed to be applied transdermally, often in “magical ointments” by herbalists, witches and cunning folk. The purpose of this was to absorb the primary and transdermally-active alkaloid scopolamine through the skin, thus eliminating the risk of the additional toxicity from atropine and hyoscyamine that is inevitably present with oral ingestion of the plant but not when used topically.

Effects
Henbane ingestion by humans is followed simultaneously by peripheral inhibition and central stimulation. Common effects of henbane ingestion include hallucinations, dilated pupils, narcosis, restlessness, and flushed skin. Less common effects are tachycardia, convulsions, vomiting, hypertension, hyperpyrexia, and ataxia. Initial effects typically last for three to four hours, while aftereffects may last up to three days. The side effects of henbane ingestion are dryness in the mouth, confusion, visual illusions, bizarre thoughts, locomotor and memory disturbances, and farsightedness, similar in style to those of other tropane-based deliriants such as plants of the New World genus datura. As a result of this distinct chemical and pharmacological profile, overdoses can result not only in delirium, but also severe anticholinergic syndrome, coma, respiratory paralysis, and death. Low and average dosages have inebriating and aphrodisiac effects.

In his book How Do Witches Fly?, Alexander Kuklin refers to an experience of black henbane had by German scientist Michael Schenck. Schenck recollected his experience:

Schenck's pulse became rapid and he experienced a further increase in the hallucinogenic effects of the plant:

Misidentification

Celebrity chef Antony Worrall Thompson accidentally recommended henbane as a "tasty addition to salads" in the August 2008 issue of Healthy and Organic Living magazine. The publication promptly warned subscribers against consuming the "very toxic" plant upon discovery of the error, and Thompson admitted to confusing it with fat hen, a member of the spinach family.

Gallery

References

General

External links

 Henbane on Erowid

General anesthetics
Deliriants
Entheogens
Flora of Europe
Flora of North Africa
Flora of temperate Asia
Flora of tropical Asia
Herbal and fungal hallucinogens
Medicinal plants of Asia
Medicinal plants of Europe
Plants described in 1753
Taxa named by Carl Linnaeus
niger
Poisonous plants
Necromancy